"Gotta Stop (Messin' About)" was the follow-up single in the UK to support Prince's third album, Dirty Mind. The single was not an album track, though it was written at the same time, and possessed a similar sound. "Gotta Stop Messin' About" marked the first time Prince released non-album tracks, which, especially as B-sides, would become a prominent part of his career.

The song is keyboard dominated, and the lyrics speak of a woman who's constantly "messin' about" with other men.  The song contains familiar Prince themes of sexual frustration, masturbation and sexual metaphors.  The track consists of two verses and multiple repeats of the chorus.  It was played live on the Dirty Mind Tour with an extended instrumental section at the end.

"Gotta Stop (Messin' About)" was released in the UK as two separate 7" singles, one with the Dirty Mind track "Uptown" as a B-side, and the other with "I Wanna Be Your Lover", from Prince.  Each single also had an accompanying 12" single, both with the same tracks as the 7" and both including the song "Head", from Dirty Mind.  Despite an extensive advertising campaign and promotion, and coinciding with Prince's first UK gig, neither issue of the single charted. The track would later be released in the U.S. as the B-side of the 12" single for "Let's Work", and become a highly sought-after collector's item.  "Gotta Stop (Messin' About)" was also later released on The Hits/The B-Sides and Prince 4Ever.

References

1981 singles
Prince (musician) songs
Songs written by Prince (musician)
Warner Records singles
Song recordings produced by Prince (musician)
1980 songs